Mogoșești-Siret is a commune in Iași County, Western Moldavia, Romania. It is composed of three villages: Mogoșești-Siret, Muncelu de Sus and Tudor Vladimirescu.

References

Communes in Iași County
Localities in Western Moldavia